The Lads of Enchantment is a barbershop quartet that won the 1957 SPEBSQSA international competition.

References 

 AIC entry

Barbershop quartets
Barbershop Harmony Society